Creatures is the fifth full-length album by indie rock group Elf Power. It was released in 2002 on spinART Records.

Track listing
All songs written by Andrew Rieger, except for where noted.
"Let the Serpent Sleep"
"Everlasting Scream"
"The Creature"
"Palace of the Flames"
"The Modern Mind"
"Visions Of The Sea"
"Things That Should Not Be"
"Three Seeds" (Rieger, William Cullen Hart) 
"The Haze"
"Unseen Hand"
"The Creature Part II"

References

Elf Power albums
2002 albums
SpinART Records albums